The following highways are numbered 305:

Canada
Manitoba Provincial Road 305
 New Brunswick Route 305
 Nova Scotia Route 305
Prince Edward Island Route 305
Saskatchewan Highway 305

China
 China National Highway 305

India
National Highway 305

Japan
 Japan National Route 305

Philippines
 N305 highway (Philippines)

United States 
 Interstates
  Interstate 305 (multiple unsigned routes)
  Interstate 305 (cancelled proposal)
  Arkansas Highway 305
  Connecticut Route 305
  Florida State Road 305 (former)
  Georgia State Route 305
  Hawaii Route 305
  Iowa Highway 305 (former)
  Kentucky Route 305
  Maryland Route 305
  Mississippi Highway 305
  Montana Secondary Highway 305
  Nevada State Route 305
  New Mexico State Road 305
  New York State Route 305
 New York State Route 305 (former)
  North Carolina Highway 305
  Ohio State Route 305
  Pennsylvania Route 305
  Tennessee State Route 305
 Texas:
  Texas State Highway 305
  Texas State Highway Loop 305
  Farm to Market Road 305
  Utah State Route 305 (former)
  Virginia State Route 305
  Washington State Route 305
  West Virginia Route 305

Other areas:
  Puerto Rico Highway 305
  U.S. Virgin Islands Highway 305